Robert Rufus Berryman (February 1902 - July 9, 1969) was an American politician who served in the Alabama House of Representatives from January 1967 until his death in July 1969.

Life
Berryman was born in February 1902 to William Andrew Berryman and Octavia M. Masterson in Lawrence County, Alabama. He was one of 9 children. On April 6, 1928, he married Kylie Terry. They had one child together. He died on July 9, 1969, at the age of 67.

References

1902 births
1969 deaths
Democratic Party members of the Alabama House of Representatives
20th-century American politicians
People from Lawrence County, Alabama